Listrocerum olseni is a species of beetle in the family Cerambycidae. It was described by Lepesme and Stephan von Breuning in 1956. It is known from Guinea.

References

Dorcaschematini
Beetles described in 1956